The Custos Rotulorum of Donegal was the highest civil officer in County Donegal.

Incumbents

1675–?1678 Arthur Chichester, 2nd Earl of Donegall (died 1678)  (also Custos Rotulorum of Antrim, 1675–?)
1678–? William Stewart, 1st Viscount Mountjoy (died 1692)
c.1700–?1723 Gustavus Hamilton, 1st Viscount Boyne (died 1723) 
1777–1804 Robert Clements, 1st Earl of Leitrim
1804–1854 Nathaniel Clements, 2nd Earl of Leitrim

For later custodes rotulorum, see Lord Lieutenant of Donegal.

References

Donegal